Oh, the Things I Know! A Guide to Success, or Failing That, Happiness is a 2003 book written by Al Franken that offers humorous life advice on everything from dating to getting a good job. The title parodies Dr. Seuss's Oh, the Places You'll Go!, which is a popular gift given to college graduates.

External links
 

Satirical books
2003 non-fiction books
Popular culture books
Books by Al Franken